The 1987 Mediterranean Non-Aligned Countries Ministerial Meeting held on Brijuni Islands, SR Croatia, SFR Yugoslavia was the second ministerial meeting of the Non-Aligned countries from the Mediterranean region. The meeting restricted the number of participating countries exclusively to the few Non-Aligned nations of the Mediterranean area and as such focused primarily on regional issues. At the time of the meeting the group included Southern Mediterranean and Levantine Arab countries and only three European Non-Aligned countries of Malta, Cyprus and SFR Yugoslavia.

Adriatic islands of Brijuni were selected as the location at which important events in the history of the movement took place, including the 1956 meeting between Yugoslav President Josip Broz Tito, Indian Prime Minister Jawaharlal Nehru, and President of Egypt Gamal Abdel Nasser, as well as numerous bilateral and informal meetings between president Tito (one of the founders of NAM) and Valentina Tereshkova, Che Guevara, Alberto Moravia, Mario Del Monaco, Sophia Loren, Elizabeth Taylor, Richard Burton and numerous state representatives.

References

See also
 Yugoslavia and the Non-Aligned Movement
 Foreign relations of Yugoslavia
 EU Med Group
 Yugoslavia at the Mediterranean Games

Mediterranean
Foreign relations of Yugoslavia
1987 conferences
1987 in politics
1987 in Croatia
Euromediterranean Partnership
International conferences in Croatia